In Crocodile Land is a 1946 Australian book by Ion Idriess about life in the Northern Territory.

References

1946 non-fiction books
Culture of the Northern Territory
Australian non-fiction books
Books by Ion Idriess
Angus & Robertson books